Pagan Dawn is a quarterly magazine featuring articles, reviews and research on polytheism, pantheism, cultural history and nature-based spirituality, published by the Pagan Federation in the United Kingdom. Founded in 1968 (thus pre-dating the Pagan Federation by three years) the journal was originally called The Wiccan until the name was changed in 1994 "to reflect the growing number of non-Wiccan members of the Pagan Federation".

Pagan Dawn is based in London. Articles cover all aspects of modern and historic paganism, from Germanic neopaganism to wicca, shamanism, druidry, and esoterica. The magazine also includes news and announcements of workshops, conferences, moots, festivals, training, groups, other magazines, and many other pieces of information.

References

External links
Pagan Dawn website 

1968 establishments in the United Kingdom
Magazines established in 1968
Modern paganism in the United Kingdom
Modern pagan magazines
Quarterly magazines published in the United Kingdom
Wicca in the United Kingdom
Magazines published in London